Acanthomyrmex padanensis is a species of ant of the genus Acanthomyrmex. Terayam, Ito & Gobin described the species in 1998, and it is native to Indonesia.

References

padanensis
Insects described in 1998
Insects of Indonesia